This is the results breakdown of the local elections held in Castilla–La Mancha on 26 May 2019. The following tables show detailed results in the autonomous community's most populous municipalities, sorted alphabetically.

Opinion polls

City control
The following table lists party control in the most populous municipalities, including provincial capitals (shown in bold). Gains for a party are displayed with the cell's background shaded in that party's colour.

Municipalities

Albacete
Population: 173,050

Ciudad Real
Population: 74,743

Cuenca
Population: 54,898

Guadalajara
Population: 84,910

Talavera de la Reina
Population: 83,009

Toledo
Population: 84,282

See also
2019 Castilian-Manchegan regional election

References

Castilla-La Mancha
2019